is a Japanese bobsledder. He competed at the 1980 Winter Olympics and the 1984 Winter Olympics.

References

1953 births
Living people
Japanese male bobsledders
Olympic bobsledders of Japan
Bobsledders at the 1980 Winter Olympics
Bobsledders at the 1984 Winter Olympics
Sportspeople from Hokkaido